Kotobeppu Yōhei  (born 17 October 1965 as Yōhei Miura) is a former sumo wrestler from Beppu, Ōita, Japan. He made his professional debut in March 1981, and reached the jūryō division in July 1989, but had to withdraw in his jūryō debut because of nephritis and a long absence from competition due to uremia saw him fall greatly in rank. During this time he was close to requiring dialysis but eventually made a full recovery. He reached the top division in November 1992, becoming the first former sekitori to fall to the lowest jonokuchi division and subsequently manage to reach the top division. The only other wrestler to achieve this feat as of January 2018 is Ryūden. A previous member of Sadogatake stable, former ōzeki Kotokaze, had fallen from sekiwake to makushita and had been referred to as "the man who saw hell" and after Kotobeppu's even bigger fall he was called, "the man who saw the new hell."  Kotobeppu received the Fighting Spirit Prize for winning ten bouts in his top division debut. His highest rank was maegashira 1.  He retired in November 1997. He trained as a ramen maker and opened a ramen restaurant  in Chiba Prefecture and later in his hometown of Beppu, Ōita where he also served chankonabe.

Career record

See also
Glossary of sumo terms
List of sumo tournament second division champions

References

External links

1965 births
Living people
Japanese sumo wrestlers
Sumo people from Ōita Prefecture
Sadogatake stable sumo wrestlers